The 1958–59 Liga Leumit season took place between November 1958 and May 1959. Hapoel Petah Tikva won the title, while Hapoel Kfar Saba, who had finished bottom the previous season (in which there was no relegation), were relegated to Liga Alef. Aharon Amar of Maccabi Haifa was the league's top scorer with 17 goals.

Final table

Results

References
Israel - List of Final Tables RSSSF

Liga Leumit seasons
Israel
1958–59 in Israeli football leagues